Aloyse Klensch (24 April 1914 – 12 July 1961) was a Luxembourgian racing cyclist. He finished in last place in the 1937 Tour de France.

References

External links

1914 births
1961 deaths
Luxembourgian male cyclists
People from Mersch (canton)